Marat Mubinovich Safin (born 27 January 1980) is a Russian retired world No. 1 tennis player and former politician. He achieved the Association of Tennis Professionals (ATP) world No. 1 singles ranking on 20 November 2000. Safin is also the older brother of former WTA world No. 1 player Dinara Safina. They are the only brother-sister tandem in tennis history who have both achieved No. 1 rankings. Safin began his professional tennis career in 1997, and held the No. 1 ranking for a total of 9 weeks between November 2000 and April 2001. He won his first Grand Slam title at the 2000 US Open, defeating Pete Sampras in the final, and won the 2005 Australian Open, defeating Lleyton Hewitt in the final. Safin helped lead Russia to Davis Cup victories in 2002 and 2006. Despite his dislike of grass courts, he became the first Russian man to reach the semifinals of Wimbledon at the 2008 Wimbledon Championships, where he lost to Roger Federer. At the time of his retirement in November 2009, he was ranked world No. 61. In 2011, he became a member of the State Duma representing the United Russia party. In 2016, he became the first Russian tennis player inducted into the International Tennis Hall of Fame.

Early life 
Safin was born in Moscow to Tatar parents, Mubin ("Mikhail") Safin and Rauza Islanova. He speaks Russian, English, and Spanish. Safin does not speak Tatar and does not feel like he has to apologize about it. His parents are former tennis players and coaches. His younger sister, Dinara, is a former world No. 1 professional tennis player and silver medalist at the 2008 Olympic Games in Beijing. Safin's father managed the local Spartak Tennis Club, where Safin trained in his youth.

At the age of 14, Safin moved to Valencia, Spain to gain access to advanced tennis training programs which were not available in Russia. Safin says he grew "very fast ... with no muscles" and that he moved to Spain because clay courts were "better for the knees".

In a 2008 interview with USA Today, Safin identified himself as a Muslim, stating, "I'm Russian, but I'm 100% Muslim. All the Muslim people are passionate, stubborn. We have hot blood." However, ten years later in an interview for Alexander Golovin of Sports.Ru he stated that though he believes in something that had created the world but doesn't really believe in personal God. Since the dissolution of the USSR, all the people of Russia have been encouraged to list themselves in accordance with the dominant religion of their ethnic group before the Soviet regime, as a sign of respect to the heritage — with all the Tatars being "ethnic Muslims" and ethnic Slavs being "Orthodoxes" by default, etc.

Tennis career

Early career 
Safin started his professional career in 1997. In 1998, Safin consecutively defeated Andre Agassi and defending champion Gustavo Kuerten at the French Open. He won his first ATP title at the age of 19, in Boston, and later in 1999 he reached the Paris, Bercy final, losing a closely contested four-set match to No. 1 Andre Agassi.

World No. 1 and Grand Slam history 

Safin held the No. 1 ATP ranking for 9 weeks during 2000 when he won his first Grand Slam tournament at the US Open, becoming the first Russian in history to win this tournament in the men's singles draw, by defeating Pete Sampras in straight sets. He barely missed finishing the year as No. 1, the top spot being overtaken by Gustavo Kuerten at the last match of the season, the final of the 2000 Tennis Masters Cup and ATP Tour World Championships (3-0 win over Andre Agassi).

Safin reached three more Grand Slam finals, all at the Australian Open (2002, 2004, and 2005). He has cited nervousness as the reason for his loss in the 2002 event, and physical exhaustion for the 2004 loss. He defeated Lleyton Hewitt in the 2005 final to secure his second Grand Slam in five years. En route to this final, he defeated top-ranked Roger Federer in a five-set semifinal match. Safin described the match as "a brain fight." He also defeated future ten-time Australian Open champion Novak Djokovic, who was making his first appearance in the main draw of a Grand Slam tournament, in the first round losing just three games.

His best result at Wimbledon was reaching the semifinals in 2008, beating No. 3 Novak Djokovic en route. He often lost in the first or second rounds in other years, although he made the quarterfinals in 2001, losing in four sets to eventual champion Goran Ivanišević. Safin dismissed his performance in the 2001 tournament as a result of luck. Safin disliked playing on grass. Safin has said: "It's difficult to [break serve]. It's difficult to play-off the baseline because [of] a lot of bad bounces." With Safin's semifinal performance at Wimbledon in 2008, he became the fourth of five active players at the time to reach the semifinals in all four Grand Slams, joining Roger Federer, David Nalbandian, and Novak Djokovic. Other active players have since then joined the list.

Masters Series 
Safin won five ATP Tennis Masters Series titles during his career. His first was in 2000 when he won the title in Toronto, Canada. He had three wins (2000, 2002, and 2004) in Paris, France, and one in 2004 in Madrid, Spain.

Tennis Masters Cup 
In 2004, Safin reached the semifinal of the Tennis Masters Cup in Houston, Texas, where he was defeated by Federer, 6–3, 7–6(20–18). The second-set tiebreak (20–18) was the third-longest tiebreak in the Open Era. Safin also reached the semifinals in 2000.

Davis Cup 
Safin helped Russia achieve its first Davis Cup victory in 2002, with a 3–2 tie-breaking win against France in the final round at the Palais Omnisports Paris Bercy. His Russian team included Yevgeny Kafelnikov, Mikhail Youzhny, Andrei Stoliarov, and captain Shamil Tarpischev. The team made Davis Cup history by being the second to win the event after losing the doubles tie-breaker, and becoming the first team to win a (live-televised) five-set finals match by coming back from a two-set deficit. Safin helped Russia to win the Davis Cup in 2006. After a straight-sets defeat by David Nalbandian in his first match, his doubles victory (partnering Dmitry Tursunov) against Nalbandian and Agustín Calleri and singles victory against José Acasuso drove Russia to victory.

In the 2009 Davis Cup quarterfinal tie, Russia was upset by the Israel Davis Cup team on indoor hard courts at the Nokia Arena in Tel Aviv. Russia was the top-ranked country in Davis Cup standings, and the stage was set by Safin, who prior to the tie told the press:  "With all due respect, Israel was lucky to get to the quarterfinals." Safin was held out of the first day of singles, and then went on to lose the clinching doubles match in five sets partnered with doubles specialist Igor Kunitsyn.

Injury history 

A succession of injuries hindered Safin's progress throughout his career.

In 2003, he missed the majority of the season due to a wrist injury.

During the 2005 clay-court season, Safin suffered a knee injury, which he played through all the way up to Wimbledon with the help of pain killers and anti-inflammatories. Safin was subsequently defeated in the early rounds of each of the seven tournaments he played between the Australian Open and the French Open, culminating in an early round defeat at the French Open. Safin made a surprise finals appearance at the Wimbledon tune-up tournament in Halle on grass. He lost the final narrowly to the defending champion, Federer.  He only played one tournament in the summer hard-court season, in Cincinnati, where he lost in the quarterfinals to Robby Ginepri. He also missed the Tennis Masters Cup.

Injuries continued to bother Safin in 2006. Although Safin made appearances at the 2006 ATP Masters tournaments at Indian Wells, Miami, Monte Carlo, Rome and Hamburg, his ranking plummeted to as low as No. 104. He began to recover in time for the 2006 US Open, in which Safin defeated No. 4 David Nalbandian in a riveting second-round match. Safin then lost in the fourth round to No. 16 Tommy Haas, also in a fifth-set tiebreaker. Positive performances at the Thailand Open, where he was narrowly edged out by No. 7 seed, James Blake, and the Kremlin Cup in Moscow, the first all-Russian final at that event, losing to compatriot, Ukrainian-born Nikolay Davydenko, marked Safin's recovery. Despite the injury, Safin still posted seven wins against top ten players in 2006, fourth-most on the ATP tour behind just Federer (19), Nadal (10), and Blake (8).

Later career

2007 

Safin did not play any warm-up tournaments in the run-up to the Australian Open. As Safin was forced to miss the tournament in 2006 because of injury, 2007 was his first Australian Open since he captured the title in 2005. Safin lost against sixth seed Andy Roddick in his third-round match in a grueling 3-hour match. Roddick commented after the match, "With Marat you know you are going to get an emotional roller-coaster. You just have to try and focus on yourself and I was able to do that tonight.

In April, Safin won the deciding quarterfinal Davis Cup rubber against France, beating Paul-Henri Mathieu in straight sets.

Safin reached the third round at Wimbledon, before falling to the defending champion Roger Federer. In July, Safin announced that he and his coach Alexander Volkov were parting ways, and that his new coach would be former pro Hernán Gumy. He won the doubles title at the Kremlin Cup in Moscow in October, his first ATP-level title since the 2005 Australian Open.

2008 
Safin prepared for the Australian Open at the invitational exhibition tournament, the AAMI Kooyong Classic in Melbourne. Other players in the field were Roddick, Fernando González, Nikolay Davydenko, Marcos Baghdatis, Ivan Ljubičić, and Andy Murray. Safin was victorious in his opening match, defeating Andy Murray. before losing in his second match to Andy Roddick, 6–3, 6–3.

In the third-place play-off, Safin rebounded from the Roddick loss and overpowered the prior year's Australian Open runner up Fernando González. Safin won his first-round match at the Australian Open against Ernests Gulbis in straight sets. He was ousted in the second round after a grueling five-set match against Baghdatis.

In February, Safin was granted wildcards into the tournaments at Memphis and Las Vegas. In Memphis, he was edged out by his 2002 Australian Open opponent, Thomas Johansson in the first round. In Las Vegas, he was defeated by Lleyton Hewitt during the semifinals. Safin was defeated by Hewitt once again.

In March, Safin lost in the first round of Indian Wells and Miami, to Jürgen Melzer and qualifier Bobby Reynolds, respectively. In the Davis Cup between Russia and the Czech Republic, Safin defeated No. 9 Tomáš Berdych in a five-set encounter, after being two sets down. This was the first time in his career that he had come back to win a match after being down two sets.

Safin's next tournament was in Valencia. He defeated No. 20-ranked and fourth seed Juan Carlos Ferrero. In spite of the fact that Ferrero is from the Valencia region, Safin was the more popular player, having been based in Valencia for many years and being a well-known Valencia CF fan. – local player Ferrero controversially favouring Real Madrid. He played Dutch teenager Robin Haase in the next round. He won the first set and was up 4–2 in the second set. However, Haase broke back to take it to a tiebreak. Safin had four match points, including one on his serve, but lost the tiebreak, and eventually the match. In the Monte Carlo Masters, Safin defeated Xavier Malisse, but then lost to No. 5 David Ferrer. He then entered the 2008 BMW Open in Munich, Germany, where he beat Carlos Berlocq in the first round. In the second round, he edged out Michael Berrer, but lost to Fernando González in his first quarterfinal of the year, and the first since June 2007 at the Legg Mason Tennis Classic in Washington, D.C. Safin entered the 2008 French Open but was eliminated in the second round by countryman and fourth seed Nikolay Davydenko, in straight sets.

Ranked at No. 75, Safin entered the 2008 Wimbledon Championships, where he defeated Fabio Fognini in the first round. In the second round, he defeated No. 3 player and 2008 Australian Open Champion Novak Djokovic. Safin's victory came as a shock as Djokovic was described as a "serious contender" to win the tournament. In the third round, he played and defeated Italian Andreas Seppi. In the fourth round, he defeated Stanislas Wawrinka. This was the first time he had reached the quarterfinals of a Grand Slam since the 2005 Australian Open. Safin went on to defeat Feliciano López in the quarterfinals to set up a semifinal clash with defending champion Roger Federer. His run to the semifinals was his best record in Wimbledon and made him the first Russian man to ever reach a Wimbledon semifinal. Safin attributed his great run at Wimbledon to the hard work he was putting in with coach Hernán Gumy. Safin then played at the Swedish Open, on clay, in Båstad against Marc López, winning in the first round. He lost his second-round match against Potito Starace.

Safin was awarded a wild card into the Rogers Cup Masters tournament in Toronto. He beat Sam Querrey in the first round. Because of rain delays, he had to play his next match against Stan Wawrinka on the same day. He lost that match. Safin was seeded fifth for his next tournament, the Countrywide Classic in Los Angeles. He defeated Americans John Isner and Wayne Odesnik in the first and second rounds, respectively, to advance to the quarterfinals, where he was defeated by Denis Gremelmayr.

At the US Open, Safin lost in the second round to Tommy Robredo. At the Moscow Kremlin Cup, he defeated Noam Okun, Julien Benneteau, Nikolay Davydenko, and Mischa Zverev, only to lose to another compatriot Igor Kunitsyn in the final. It was Safin's first final appearance since 2006, in the same event. Following the Kremlin Cup, Safin withdrew from the Madrid Masters event with a shoulder injury. His next event was the St. Petersburg Open, at which he lost in the second round. He then lost his first-round match at the final ATP tournament of the calendar: the Paris Masters, to Juan Mónaco. In the post-match conference, he raised the possibility of his retirement from the sport. Via a message posted on his official website, he said he was going to take a holiday and then seriously consider his options regarding his future in tennis. He finished the year 2008 ranked at No. 29.

2009 

Safin started the 2009 season by playing in the Hopman Cup event in Perth with his sister, Dinara Safina. He arrived at the event sporting a bandaged right thumb, two black eyes, a blood-filled left eye, and a cut near his right eye, all suffered in a fight several weeks earlier in Moscow. In the 2009 Hopman Cup, the pair played off in the final representing Russia, but each was defeated in the singles rubbers. Safin said he had decided to play the 2009 season because of a great offer from his manager Ion Ţiriac, he made this decision despite not having a coach. 

Safin withdrew from the Kooyong Classic tournament because of a shoulder injury, but recovered to play his first-round Australian Open match, which he won in straight sets over Iván Navarro of Spain. In the second round, Safin defeated another Spanish player, Guillermo García-López. In the third round, he came up against Federer and lost in straight sets. His next tournament was the Barclays Dubai Tennis Championships. He exited in the first round, losing to Richard Gasquet, and exited in the semifinals in doubles with David Ferrer. In March, Safin helped Russia advance to the Davis Cup quarterfinals by beating Victor Crivoi of Romania in the first rubber in straight sets.

Starting the year at No. 29 in the world, he placed in the top 20 during the year for the first time since the end of January 2006. His doubles ranking also improved from 300 to 195. In the first round at Wimbledon, at which he was seeded 14th, he was upset by 21-year-old American Jesse Levine.

Safin played at the Catella Swedish Open at Båstad, where he lost to Nicolás Almagro of Spain. He began his hard-court season by making it to the quarterfinals of the LA Tennis Open (his first quarterfinal of the season), where he lost to Tommy Haas.

He lost in the first round of the U.S. Open, his last Grand Slam, to Austrian Jürgen Melzer. After a second-round loss in the PTT Thailand Open, he found some late form, coming into the China Open tournament held in Beijing; beating José Acasuso in the first round. In the second round, he played Fernando González and produced a win. In the quarterfinals, he lost against top seed Rafael Nadal. As the tour rolled into Moscow for the Kremlin Cup, it marked the beginning of the end for Safin, as he played his last competitive matches in his native Russia. He defeated No. 6 Nikolay Davydenko in the first round, but lost in the second round. He then played at the 2009 St. Petersburg Open, reaching the semifinals.

Retirement 
Safin's final tournament as a professional tennis player was at the 2009 Paris Masters. In the first round, he saved three match points with three aces against Thierry Ascione, eventually prevailing with a total of 24 aces and 41 winners. On 11 November 2009, Safin's career ended with a second-round defeat by reigning US Open champion Juan Martín del Potro, after which a special presentation ceremony was held on Centre Court at Bercy. Fellow tennis players who joined him in the ceremony included Juan Martín del Potro, Novak Djokovic, Gilles Simon, Tommy Robredo, Frederico Gil, Ivo Karlović, Albert Costa, Marc Rosset, and Younes El Aynaoui.

Playing style 

Safin was often characterized as a powerful offensive baseliner. Boris Becker, in 1999, said that he had not seen anybody hit the ball as hard from both wings for "a long, long time". He has a strong and accurate serve and a great forehand, while also possessing one of the best two-handed backhands of all time. He was also capable of playing at the net, with his volleys also being effective. However, lack of consistency and motivation was described as Safin's ultimate weakness, starting after his victory at the 2005 Australian Open.

Safin generally dominated during the fast indoor hard/carpet season, which is usually during the last few weeks on tour; Safin considered grass to be his least favourite playing surface, despite the similarities between indoor courts and grass courts even though other opponents with similar playing styles generally dominate on it.

He is known as one of the most talented players ever during his time on the tour; however his career was hampered by persistent injuries and lack of determination that prevented the prolongation of his dominance, and is therefore agreed by many pundits and fans as one of the biggest underachievers in tennis.

Safin was also known for his emotional outbursts during matches, and smashed numerous rackets. Safin is estimated to have smashed 48 racquets in 1999. In 2011, Safin stated that during his career he broke 1055 racquets.

Equipment 
Safin has used the Head Prestige Classic 600 since 1997 however throughout the years sported numerous paintjobs of the latest Head Prestige rackets (i.e. intelligence, Liquidmetal, Flexpoint and Microgel). His racquets used to be strung using Babolat VS Natural Team Gut 17L gauge, but he then switched to Luxilon Big Banger Original at 62 to 67 pounds. His apparel was manufactured by Adidas and he was the figurehead of the 'Competition' line from 2000 onward.

Career statistics

Grand Slam tournament performance timeline 

1At the 2003 Australian Open, Safin withdrew prior to the third round.

Grand Slam tournament finals: 4 (2 titles, 2 runner-ups)

Post-retirement career 
Since retirement Safin has been an official for the Russian Tennis Federation and a member of the Russian Olympic Committee. In 2011, he began playing at the ATP Champions Tour.

In December 2011, Safin was elected to the Russian Parliament as a member of Vladimir Putin's United Russia Party, representing Nizhny Novgorod.  On May 25, 2017, he voluntarily resigned from the position.

See also
 List of Grand Slam men's singles champions

Notes

References

External links

 
 
 

1980 births
Living people
Australian Open (tennis) champions
Grand Slam (tennis) champions in men's singles
Hopman Cup competitors
Laureus World Sports Awards winners
Olympic tennis players of Russia
People from Monte Carlo
Russian expatriate sportspeople in Monaco
Russian expatriate sportspeople in Spain
Russian male tennis players
Tennis players from Moscow
Tatar people of Russia
Tennis players at the 2000 Summer Olympics
Tennis players at the 2004 Summer Olympics
US Open (tennis) champions
Russian sportsperson-politicians
Tatar politicians
Tatar sportspeople
United Russia politicians
21st-century Russian politicians
International Tennis Hall of Fame inductees
Russian agnostics
Russian former Muslims
Sixth convocation members of the State Duma (Russian Federation)
Seventh convocation members of the State Duma (Russian Federation)
ATP number 1 ranked singles tennis players